Yordan Kanev (born 31 May 1984) is a former professional tennis player from Bulgaria. Between 2004 and 2007 he has frequently part of Bulgaria's Davis Cup national team. On 9 August 2004, he reached his highest ATP singles ranking of 306 whilst his best doubles ranking was 366 on 13 September 2004.

Year-end rankings

Challenger and Futures Finals

Singles: 4 (1–3)

Doubles: 11 (4–7)

Davis Cup 
Yordan Kanev debuted for the Bulgaria Davis Cup team in 2004. Since then he has 9 nominations with 8 ties played, his singles W/L record is 2–5 and doubles W/L record is 1–2 (3–7 overall).

Singles (2–5)

Doubles (1–2)

References

External links
 
 
 

1984 births
Living people
Bulgarian male tennis players
Sportspeople from Pazardzhik
21st-century Bulgarian people